Toxolophosaurus was a sphenodont from the Early Cretaceous-age Kootenai Formation of Montana.

Discovery
Toxolophosaurus cloudi was found by Olson in 1960 in the Kootenai Formation, 223.75 feet above the base of the Kootenai.

Classification
Toxolophosaurus was placed in Sphenodontidae by Michael Benton in 1985. It is closely related to Priosphenodon and Eilenodon.

Diet
Toxolophosaurus was herbivorous.

See also

Lepidosauromorpha
Lepidosauria
Sphenodontia / Rhynchocephalia
Opisthodontia
Opisthias

References

Early Cretaceous reptiles of North America
Sphenodontia